Paležnica Donja (Cyrillic: Палежница Доња) is a village in the municipalities of Doboj and Gračanica, Bosnia and Herzegovina.

Demographics 
According to the 2013 census, its population was 172, all of them living in the Doboj part, thus none in Gračanica municipality.

References

Villages in Republika Srpska
Populated places in Doboj
Populated places in Gračanica